Quasicravenoceras is a genus of ammonites in the goniatitid family Cravenoceratidae from the Carboniferous of Russia and Kazakhstan, included in the Neoglyphioceratoidea. The type species is Quasicravenoceras consuetum Ruzhencev & Bogoslovskaya, 1971.

Diagnosis
Quasicravenoveras is characterized by a moderately large, variably involute, subdiscoidal shell, or conch.
The surface is covered with sharp lamella that can appear as narrow ribs. The sides of the ventral lobe are divergent, separated by a short median saddle

Related genera include Cravenoceras, Cravenoceratoides, Emstites, and Gorboviceras.

References 

 Quasicravenoceras in Gonait on Line
Quasicravenoceras in Fossilworks

Carboniferous ammonites
Goniatitida genera
Fossils of Kazakhstan
Cravenoceratidae